Maximilian Marterer was the defending champion but chose not to defend his title.

Alessandro Giannessi won the title after defeating Carlos Berlocq 6–7(6–8), 6–4, 6–4 in the final.

Seeds

Draw

Finals

Top half

Bottom half

References
Main Draw
Qualifying Draw

Banja Luka Challenger - Singles
2018 Singles